The women's cycling sprint at the 2019 European Games was held at the Minsk Velodrome on 29 and 30 June 2019.

Results

Qualifying
The top two riders advanced directly to the 1/16 finals; others advanced to the 1/32 finals.

1/32 finals
Heat winners advanced to the 1/16 finals; others advanced to the 1/32 finals repechage.

1/32 finals repechage
Heat winners advanced to the 1/16 finals.

1/16 finals
Heat winners advanced to the 1/8 finals; others advanced to the 1/16 finals repechage.

1/16 finals repechage
Heat winners advanced to the 1/8 finals.

1/8 finals
Heat winners advanced to the quarterfinals; others advanced to the 1/8 finals repechage.

1/8 finals repechage
Heat winners advanced to the quarterfinals.

Quarterfinals
Matches are extended to a best-of-three format hereon; winners proceed to the semifinals.

Semifinals
Winners proceed to the gold medal final; losers proceed to the bronze medal final.

Finals

References

Women's sprint